Thomas Collins (1825 – 26 Nov 1884) was a Conservative Party politician in England.

He was elected as Member of Parliament (MP) for Knaresborough at a by-election in 1851 following the death of William Lascelles, but was defeated at the 1852 general election. He regained the seat at the 1857 general election and held it in 1859, but was defeated again at the 1865 general election.

Collins was returned to the House of Commons at the 1868 general election for Boston, but lost that seat at the 1874 general election.

He stood unsuccessfully in Derby at the 1880 general election, but won a by-election in Knaresborough in 1881, and held that seat until his death in 1884.

References

External links 

 

1825 births
1884 deaths
Conservative Party (UK) MPs for English constituencies
UK MPs 1847–1852
UK MPs 1857–1859
UK MPs 1859–1865
UK MPs 1868–1874
UK MPs 1880–1885